International Institute of Management and Technical Studies (IIMT STUDIES) is  an Indian-based educational outfit offering  e-learning and distance education to working professionals.

History
International Institute of Management and Technical Studies (IIMT Studies) was  founded in 2009  by “Bharti Lokseva Charitable Trust”  with its head office located in Ahmedabad, India. The institute is registered under the Bombay Public Trusts act of the Government of India.

IIMT Studies  has branches in Ahmedabad, Mumbai and Surat, Gujarat State. It also has an extended international arm in London, United Kingdom.

In 2017, IIMT Studies launched a book for the HR professionals, known as the "HRishta".

Academics

Accreditation and affiliations
IIMT Studies is accredited by the British Accreditation Council of the UK as an Open and Blended learning Provider.

IIMT Studies is affiliated with the Gujarat University for short certification courses. It is also affiliated to the Institution of Engineers, Gujarat State Certer and European Association for Distance Learning.

Partnerships
IIMT Studies is a partner institute of the Directorate of Employment and Training for Conducting Virtual Classes and  Gujarat Knowledge Society, Department of Technical Education, Government of India. 

IIMT Studies also has its tie-up with the Maharaja Sayajirao University of Vadodara.

Courses
IIMT Studies offers  e-learning  and  part time certificate courses to working professionals who do not have much time to spend for studies.

The institute offers  diploma and postgraduate courses in affiliation with the Institution of Engineers, Gujarat State centre. It  offers  courses with the HRDC-UGC of the Kumaun University of Nainital. It also  offers its courses in Gulf Countries such as Dubai and Kuwait.

IIMT Studies runs the government institute ITI Vadagam (Dhansura) and offers short certificate courses.

Awards and recognition

 2019 -  IIMT Studies Ltd, UK received an award from the World Education Summit for Innovation in eLearning and Blended Learning.

See also
 Distance education
 E-learning (theory)
 European Association for Distance Learning
 Bharati Vidyapeeth Institute Of Management and Research
 All India Council for Technical Education

References

External links
 IIMT Studies, Surat and Mumbai website
 IIMT Studies, London website

Distance education institutions based in India
Distance education institutions based in the United Kingdom